Lorenzo "Lore" Mannino (born 1959) is according to the Federal Bureau of Investigation a powerful caporegime in the Gambino crime family.

In 1994, Mannino pleaded guilty to drug trafficking and conspiring to murder Francesco Oliveri in 1988, and was sentenced 15 years in prison. He was released in 2004. The 1994 plea followed a 1993 trial in which John Gambino, Joseph Gambino and Matteo Romano were co-defendants, which ended in mistrial in June 1993 when the jury was unable to reach a verdict. Salvatore Gravano testified to the participation of John, Joseph and  Mannino in the murder of Oliveri, to a racketeering enterprise and the Gambino crime family's rule against drugs.

According to a 2007 New York Post article on the establishment of a "cooperative venture" with FBI agents stationed in Rome and Italian National Police working at the FBI Headquarters in Washington, Mannino once tried to get Frank Sinatra to help crooner Al Martino find work in Las Vegas, and was a "rising crime-family star".

In March 2019, Gambino soldier Paul Semplice, 55, was given a 28-month prison term for running a loan-sharking operation, after pleading guilty in October 2018 to loaning money to a stressed-out business owner and a gambling addict who wound up dying from a stroke. Semplice described beating one victim in a wire-tapped call, and told a cooperating witness during a wiretapped call that Mannino was his supervisor.

References

Bosses of the Gambino crime family
Inzerillo-Gambino Mafia clan
American drug traffickers
American prisoners and detainees
Prisoners and detainees of the United States federal government
Criminals from New York City
American gangsters of Sicilian descent
Living people
1959 births